This is a list of awards and nominations received by MNEK.

Awards and nominations 
{| class="wikitable sortable plainrowheaders"
|-
! scope="col" | Award
! scope="col" | Year
! scope="col" | Recipient(s) and nominee(s)
! scope="col" | Category
! scope="col" | Result
! scope="col" class="unsortable"| 
|-
! scope="row" rowspan="2"| APRA Music Awards of 2022
| rowspan="2"| 2022
| rowspan="2"| "Head & Heart" featuring MNEK
| Most Performed Dance/Electronic Work
| 
| rowspan="2"|
|-
| Most Performed Australian Work
| 
|-

! scope="row" rowspan="4"| ASCAP London Awards
| 2016
| Himself
| Vanguard Award
| 
| style="text-align:center;"|
|-
| rowspan="2"| 2017
| rowspan="2"| "Never Forget You"
| Top EDM Song
| 
| style="text-align:center;" rowspan="2"|
|-
| Winning Song
| 
|-
| 2018
| "You Don't Know Me"
| Winning Song
| 
| style="text-align:center;"|
|-
! scope="row"| ASCAP Pop Music Awards
| 2017
| "Never Forget You"
| Winning Song
| 
| style="text-align:center;"|
|-
! scope="row"| ASCAP Rhythm & Soul Music Awards
| 2017
| "Hold Up"
| Winning Song
| 
| style="text-align:center;"|
|-
! scope="row"| Attitude Awards
| 2016
| Himself
| Breakout Artist of the Year
| 
| style="text-align:center;"|
|-
! scope="row"| BET Awards
| 2015
| Himself
| Best International Act: UK
| 
| style="text-align:center;"|
|-
! scope="row"| BBC Sound of...
| 2014
| Himself
| Sound of 2014
| 
| style="text-align:center;"|
|-
!scope="row"|Brit Awards
| 2021
| "Head & Heart"
| Song of the Year
| 
| 
|-
!scope="row"|British LGBT Awards
| 2021
| Himself
| Music Artist
| 
| 
|-
! scope="row"| Grammy Awards
| 2014
| "Need U (100%)"
| Best Dance Recording
| 
| style="text-align:center;"|
|-
! scope="row"|Hungarian Music Awards
| 2021
| rowspan=2|"Head & Heart"
| Best Foreign Electronic Recording
| 
| 
|-
!scope="row" rowspan=2|Ivor Novello Awards
| rowspan=2|2021
| Most Performed Work
| 
| rowspan=2|
|-
| Himself
| Songwriter of the Year
| 
|-
! scope="row"| Latin American Music Awards
| 2016
| "Never Forget You" 
| Favorite Dance Song
| 
| style="text-align:center;"|
|-
! scope="row"| MOBO Awards
| 2014
| Himself
| Best Newcomer
| 
| style="text-align:center;"|
|-
! scope="row"|Queerty Awards
| 2019
| "Colour"
| Queer Anthem
| 
|
|-
! scope="row"| Radio Disney Music Awards
| 2017
| "Never Forget You" 
| Best Dance Track
| 
| style="text-align:center;"|
|-
! scope="row"| Scandipop Awards
| 2016
| "Never Forget You" 
| Best Video
| 
| style="text-align:center;"|
|-
! scope="row"| Teen Choice Awards
| 2016
| "Never Forget You" 
| Choice Music: Break-Up Song
| 
| style="text-align:center;"|
|-
! scope="row"|UK Music Video Awards
| 2018
| "Blinded by Your Grace, Pt. 2"
| Best Pop Video - UK
| 
|

Notes

References

MNEK
Awards